Beclardia is a genus of flowering plants from the orchid family, Orchidaceae. There are two recognized species, both native to islands in the Indian Ocean:

 Beclardia grandiflora Bosser - Madagascar
 Beclardia macrostachya (Thouars) A.Rich. - Madagascar, Mauritius, Réunion

See also 
 List of Orchidaceae genera

References 

 Pridgeon, A.M., Cribb, P.J., Chase, M.A. & Rasmussen, F. eds. (1999). Genera Orchidacearum 1. Oxford Univ. Press.
 Pridgeon, A.M., Cribb, P.J., Chase, M.A. & Rasmussen, F. eds. (2001). Genera Orchidacearum 2. Oxford Univ. Press.
 Pridgeon, A.M., Cribb, P.J., Chase, M.A. & Rasmussen, F. eds. (2003). Genera Orchidacearum 3. Oxford Univ. Press
 Berg Pana, H. 2005. Handbuch der Orchideen-Namen. Dictionary of Orchid Names. Dizionario dei nomi delle orchidee. Ulmer, Stuttgart

External links 

Vandeae genera
Orchids of Madagascar
Orchids of Mauritius
Orchids of Réunion
Angraecinae